Liuji is a town in  Dong'e County in western Shandong province, China, located less than  northwest of the Yellow River and  southwest of the county seat. , it has 85 villages under its administration.

See also 
 List of township-level divisions of Shandong

References 

Township-level divisions of Shandong
Dong'e County